The Bronx Open (currently sponsored as the NYJTL Bronx Open) is a tournament for professional female tennis players played on outdoor hardcourts. It is classified as a $60,000 ITF Women's World Tennis Tour event and has been held in The Bronx, New York, since 1996.

In 2019, it was held as a once-off WTA International event before returning on the ITF Women's World Tennis Tour in 2022.

Past finals

Singles

Doubles

References

External links
 Official website

 
WTA Tour
ITF Women's World Tennis Tour
Women's tennis tournaments in the United States
Hard court tennis tournaments in the United States
Tennis tournaments in New York City
Sports in the Bronx
1996 establishments in New York City
20th century in the Bronx
21st century in the Bronx
Recurring sporting events established in 1996